Chandler High School is a high school and historical landmark located in Chandler, Arizona, United States. It is one of Arizona's largest high schools serving 3,000 to 4,000
students annually.

History
According to published records, the earliest known educational facility in the city was 1907 being described as canvas style rooms. The second facility was known as the Chandler Grammar School, later changed to the Cleveland School, was opened June 21, 1912 at the cost of $9,000. Both prior schools accepted 6-8 grade students. In September 1914, a more permanent solution was purposed requiring a 1919 bond of $121,800 and 1921 bond of $170,000 to begin planning and construction of a high school.

Breaking ground in 1921 and dedicated the subsequent year, the facility currently referred to as Old Main, was constructed along with a small gymnasium. Both structures were placed on the National Register of Historic Places in 2007, 1 of 17 high schools in Phoenix. Several expansions and upgrades have been made to the campus which resides on the Northwest corner of Arizona Avenue/SR 87 and Chandler Blvd.

The school and subsequent city's namesake comes from founder Dr. Alexander John "A.J." Chandler a local veterinary surgeon.

Academics

Chandler abides by the standards set by the Arizona Department of Education and implements the state's Education and Career Action Plan (ECAP) required for all students 9-12 grade students to graduate from a public Arizona high school. CUSD high schools also implements an open enrollment policy, meaning students from outside the intended school boundaries may attend without tuition or other penalties.

Arizona requires that all high school students take 6 credit bearing courses during their freshmen through junior years, and have the option of reducing credits to 4 credit bearing courses if they are track for graduation. However, CUSD requires all students must complete 22 credits whereas the public university system controlled by the Arizona Board of Regents requires only 16 credits in the following areas:

 English - 4 credits
 Mathematics - 4 credits
 Science - 3 credits
 Social Studies. - 3 credits
 Career and Technical Educator/Fine Arts - 1 credit
 Physical Education - 1 credit
 Comprehensive Health - ½ credits
 Elective Courses - 5 ½ credits

Cross-credit courses
At Chandler and all CUSD high school students may swap three semesters ( credits per semester) of Spiritline, Beginning through Advance Dance, Drill Team, Color Guard, Marching Band, Winter guard, or AFJROTC essentially waiving the required one Physical Education credit required for graduation.

Students which choose applied sciences in areas such as Applied Biology or Applied Agricultural Sciences gain equivalent Science credits. Likewise, Economics credits can be awarded like Agricultural Business Management, Business, Business Applications, Marketing, Economics Applications, Family and Consumer Sciences, and vocational courses.

Community college credits can be awarded through a partnership with Chandler-Gilbert Community College (CGCC) and cooperative credits for vocational courses are provided by East Valley Institute of Technology (EVIT). Students must be dually enrolled for the Arizona community college or the Arizona public university system to accept the credits towards a degree. CUSD Transportation Department provides routes between Chandler, EVIT, and CGCC with after school hours transportation intended for students participating in activities.

Advanced Placement (AP) courses are available on school grounds in Mathematics, English, Social Studies, and Science which garner university credits nationwide and is 1 of 8 Arizona high schools offering the International Baccalaureate Diploma Programme.

Accolades
Chandler was awarded the Blue Ribbon School during 1982-83 and 1986-87 school years. It has also received 7 A+ School of Excellence from the Arizona Education Foundation, the most in the state.

Statistics
Chandler has 1,218 students enrolled in the Free Lunch Program, 197 for the Reduced-price Lunch Program, and 610 that are Directly Certified under the National School Lunch Program.

Extracurricular activities

Athletics
Chandler is an Arizona Interscholastic Association (AIA) member school offering boys and girls sports complying with Title IX. Student athletes can participate in varsity, junior varsity, and freshmen only teams as well as individual sports. Chandler Athletics consist of these sports:

 Badminton (girls)
 Baseball
 Basketball (boys)
 Basketball (girls)
 Cheer
 Cross country
 Football
 Golf (boys)
 Golf (girls)
 Lacrosse (girls)
 Pomline
 Soccer (boys)
 Soccer (girls)
 Softball
 Swim and dive
 Tennis (boys)
 Tennis (girls)
 Track and field
 Volleyball (boys)
 Volleyball (girls)
 Wrestling

Football

In 2014, Chandler football won its first championship after defeating their rival Hamilton High School Division I State Championship game. Starting in 2016 Chandler won three consecutive championship in the AIA's largest division, the last being in the open bracket comprising the eight best teams in Arizona according to the MaxPreps rating system. The team has been ranked as high as 12th nationally according to the 2015 MaxPreps' Xcelent 25 Rankings and finished on the list 3 times. Aguano resigned as head football coach in 2018 for Arizona State University's running backs coach vacating the position for offensive coordinator Rick Garretson which had a 13-0 first season and a state championship.

Chandler has successfully competed against the top teams in the nation. They start with a 2013 loss to #1 St. John Bosco High School at home 52–13. The 2014 team was able to get their first out of state victory against Valor Christian High School with a final score of 22–7. Traveling into Las Vegas, Nevada during the 2015 season ranked 20th nationally played in a high-profile game against #3 Bishop Gorman High School losing 35-14 which was broadcast on ESPNU. Chandler also hosted #2 IMG Academy going into the game ranked 7th ultimately losing 27–14 in 2017. The team went on the road the next two years playing Las Vegas' Faith Lutheran High School and Capital Christian High School winning 35-21 and 56-0 respectively. Overall Chandler has a 3–3 record against out of state opponents.

Fine Arts
Chandler High School is also notable for its active and competitive music programs. Chandler High School Chorale was the first American high school to be invited to perform at the 2005 Jilin College of the Arts Summer Music Festival in Changchun, People's Republic of China, and not only once, but twice to perform at Carnegie Hall for a festival, while Chandler High School's Wolf Pack Pride Marching Band competed in the 2005-2006 Fiesta Bowl National Band Championship, placing fifth. The marching band competed again in the 2008-2009 Championship. The Symphonic Band also competed April 2006 in Boston at the Boston Symphony Hall in the Heritage Festival of Gold. The band took fourth. The Symphonic Band competed again in April 2008 at the Davies Symphony Hall in San Francisco, taking first. In 2009, the Symphonic Band returned (for its third time) to the Festival of Gold in Los Angeles where it again took first place over groups from across the nation. In 2010, Chandler's Chorale visited the Festival of Gold, taking first as well. Chandler High's Varsity Jazz Ensemble has recently excelled on a local level.

In addition, Chandler's theater department has performed several well-known plays, including from Charlie and the Chocolate Factory, Outsiders, Miser, Rebel Without a Cause, Footloose, Still Life With Iris, and many more. The Chandler theatre has been to the Central Arizona Acting Festival and many students received Superior. A.P.A.C. (Advanced Pantomime And Characterization), the highest level acting class at Chandler, has performed numerous books for elementary students through Bookends, a program designed to promote literacy, for many years.

Rivalry
A rivalry developed between Chandler and Hamilton High School which are separated by  along Arizona Avenue/SR 87. Local media has since daubed this high-profile competition as the "Battle of Arizona Avenue". The annual varsity football matchup gains the most attention where the highly rated players are often recruited by college football coaches from across the nation. Fan turnout can exceeded 10,000 with NFL players like Anquan Boldin, Larry Fitzgerald, and Matt Leinart also in attendance. As a consistent Top 25 rivalry, the GEICO High School Bowl Series has been instrumental in broadcast the game nationally by ESPN, ESPNU, and the NFHS Network.
Every year the game would alternate form Chandler's Austin Field to Hamilton's Jerry Looper Stadium. Hamilton began matchup with a 17-game win streak of until the 2013 regular season matchup gave Chandler their first win 26–16. Chandler would later fall in a 2013 5A Division I State Semifinal matchup to Hamilton 21–17 at the approved Arizona Interscholastic Association neutral field at Highland High School. Since 2014 Chandler has won six consecutive games. As of 2020, Hamilton leads the series 18–8 with a potential rematch during the 2020 Open Bracket, which contains 8 of the highest ranked teams. Together, the two school account for 12 Big School State Championships in football.

As the rivalry developed beyond football, both school's athletic teams and other activities have become very competitive. Chandler city officials and other organizations have help facilitate and advance the rivalry. The most notable addition was the Chandler Rotary Club providing the trophy where brass plate are inscribed with the victors name and date with a custom street sign labeled "Arizona Ave Champions" affixed on top. They also host a luncheon with school staff, administrators, and inductees to the Chandler Sports Hall of Fame.

Since the rivalry garners so much attention, administrations of both schools and the district have worked closely with school resource officers with all Chandler Unified School District privately contracted security guards ensuring the stadiums and surrounding areas remain secure. The Chandler Police Department has also provided social media monitoring leading up to the game.

In Popular Culture
On February 18, 2009, TV Land's High School Reunion began its second season featuring a cast from Chandler High School's 1988 class. Terry Williams, the principal during 1988, aided producers in finding former students saying, "We are looking for a variety of people." The show was not well received as producers allegedly filled the remaining cast members with actors for the means of developing drama. The cast felt they were made into caricatures and situations felt awkward.

Notable alumni
 Casey Likes, actor who starred as William Miller in Almost Famous
 Adam Archuleta - NFL - player with the St. Louis Rams, Washington Redskins, Chicago Bears, and Oakland Raiders
 Eddie Basha Jr. - Businessman - Bashas' Inc.
Sanjay Beach - NFL\WLAF - former player with the Dallas Cowboys, New York Jets, San Francisco 49ers, Green Bay Packers, Amsterdam Admirals, Denver Broncos
N'Keal Harry - NFL - player with the New England Patriots
 Alexa Havins - Actress - film and television
 Brett Hundley - NFL - player with the Green Bay Packers, Seattle Seahawks, and Arizona Cardinals
 Cameron Jordan - NFL - player with the New Orleans Saints
 Dion Jordan - NFL - player with the Miami Dolphins, Seattle Seahawks, Oakland Raiders, and San Francisco 49ers
 Bryce Perkins - NFL - player with the Los Angeles Rams
 Paul Perkins - NFL - player with the New York Giants, Detroit Lions, Jacksonville Jaguars, Baltimore Ravens, and Indianapolis Colts
 Cody Ransom - MLB/PCL - former player with the San Francisco Giants, Houston Astros, New York Yankees, Philadelphia Phillies, Arizona Diamondbacks, Milwaukee Brewers, San Diego Padres, Chicago Cubs, and Saitama Seibu Lions
 Derrick Richardson - NFL/UFL - former player with the Pittsburgh Steelers practice squad and the Florida Tuskers
 Gordon Rule - NFL - former player with the Green Bay Packers
 Brent R. Taylor - Politician/US Military - mayor of North Ogden, Utah, Army National Guard officer
 Lindsay Taylor - WNBA/TKBL/LFB/WKBL - former player and Hamilton High School's Varsity Assistant Coach
 Dave Van Gorder - MLB - former player with the Cincinnati Reds and Baltimore Orioles
 Lawrence Westbrook - NBAG/BBL - former player with the Maine Red Claws, Dakota Wizards, Texas Legends, Kazrin/Galil, Neckar Riesen Ludwigsburg, and CS Universitatea Mobitelco Cluj-Napoca
 Markus Wheaton - NFL - former player with the Pittsburgh Steelers, Chicago Bears, and Philadelphia Eagles
 Eddie Wilson - NFL - former player with the Dallas Texans, Kansas City Chiefs, and Boston Patriots
 Dustin Woodard - NFL - player with the New England Patriots

References

External links

 
 School report card from the Arizona Department of Education

Educational institutions established in 1912
Public high schools in Arizona
International Baccalaureate schools in Arizona
Education in Chandler, Arizona
National Register of Historic Places in Maricopa County, Arizona
Neoclassical architecture in Arizona
1912 establishments in Arizona
Schools in Maricopa County, Arizona
School buildings on the National Register of Historic Places in Arizona